Small Block is the debut EP of the Huntington Beach pop punk band Big Drill Car, released in 1988 on their own  Records! label and again in 1990 on Cruz Records.

To save money on mastering, Big Drill Car placed all six tracks on the A-side of the record, not only to let the B-side remain shiny and smooth, but also to save listeners the annoyance of having to flip the record over after seven minutes. When asked why the vinyl version of this EP would have one side, frontman Frank Daly replied:

Like many Big Drill Car albums, Small Block is currently out of print.

Track listing
"5 Year Itch" (Arnold, Daly) - 3:24
"Glory" (Daly) - 2:04
"Les Cochons Sans Poils" (Daly, Thomson) - 2:53
"Let Me Walk" (Arnold, Daly, Thomson) - 3:01
"Mag Wheel" (Arnold, Daly, Thomson, Marcroft) - 2:30
"Annie's Needle" (Daly, Marcroft) - 2:38

Personnel
Frank Daly - Vocals
Mark Arnold - Guitar
Bob Thomson - Bass
Danny Marcroft - Drums
Additional personnel
Stephen Egerton - Engineer, Producer
Richard Andrews - Engineer, Producer

References

1988 debut EPs
Big Drill Car albums
Cruz Records EPs